The 2018 Lory Meagher Cup was the 10th staging of the Lory Meagher Cup, the Gaelic Athletic Association's fifth tier inter-county hurling championship. The draw for the 2018 fixtures took place on 25 October 2017. The cup begun on 19 May 2018 and ended on 23 June 2018 with Sligo beating Lancashire at Croke Park.

Group stage

Table

Round 1

Round 2

Round 3

Lory Meagher Final

Scoring statistics

Overall

Top scorers in a single game

References

Lory
Lory Meagher Cup